The Astor Court Building is a 12-story, 164 unit apartment building on Broadway between West 89th Street and 90th Street on the Upper West Side of Manhattan in New York City, built in 1916.  It was designed by architect Charles A. Platt for developer Vincent Astor. The twelve-story building is constructed around a landscaped courtyard. Architectural historian Christopher Gray believes that the landscape architect may have been Ellen Biddle Shipman. The building became a co-op in 1985.

Famous residents include Joy Behar from The View.

References

Residential buildings completed in 1916
Condominiums and housing cooperatives in Manhattan
Upper West Side
Broadway (Manhattan)
Residential buildings in Manhattan
1916 establishments in New York City